Berg am Laim (Central Bavarian: Berg am Loam) is a southeastern borough of Munich, Bavaria, Germany.

Notable landmarks

Das Kartoffelmuseum
Erzbruderschaft St. Michael
Innsbrucker Ring
Innsbrucker-Ring-Tunnel
Kultfabrik
Leuchtenbergring
Leuchtenbergring-Tunnel
Medienbrücke
Michaeli-Gymnasium München
Offenbarungskirche (Munich)
Piusplatz (Munich)
Schüleinbrunnen
St. Michael
St. Pius (Munich)
Stimmkreis München-Bogenhausen
Technisches Rathaus
U-Bahnhof Innsbrucker Ring
U-Bahnhof Josephsburg
U-Bahnhof Kreillerstraße
U-Bahnhof Michaelibad
Ultraschall
Werksviertel

Culture 

Since 1996 Berg am Laim was for almost two decades a center of Munich's nightlife due to the Kunstpark Ost and its successor Kultfabrik, a former industrial complex that was converted to a large party area near München Ostbahnhof. The internationally known nightlife district hosted more than 30 clubs and was especially popular among younger people and residents of the metropolitan area surrounding Munich. Famous nightclubs within the Kunstpark Ost were for example the techno clubs Ultraschall,  and Natraj Temple as well as Babylon which addressed younger party-goers. Beside the nightlife venues, the area also hosted many ateliers and craft enterprises.

Additionally, the smaller neighboring factory site Optimolwerke was also converted to a party area in 2003, hosting popular venues such as for example Harry Klein, Milchbar, Bullit and Grinsekatze, and in further former factory halls named Georg-Elser-Hallen also concerts and club nights took place from 2000 to 2008.

The Kultfabrik was closed at the end of the year 2015 to convert the area into a residential and office area named Werksviertel. The neighboring Optimolwerke closed in January 2018 and were demolished in the course of the same year.

Economy 

A number of media companies have their offices in the new Werksviertel district which was formerly the Kunstpark Ost, as well as within the neighboring business park Media Works. The company Deutsche Telekom operates a large development center in the Ten Towers high rise buildings.

References 

Boroughs of Munich
Entertainment districts in Germany